The 1955 Pittsburgh Steelers season was the franchise's 23rd in the National Football League.

Regular season

Schedule 

Note: Intra-conference opponents are in bold text.

Game summaries

Week 1 (Monday September 26, 1955): Chicago Cardinals 

at Forbes Field, Pittsburgh, Pennsylvania

 Game time:
 Game weather:
 Game attendance: 26,359
 Referee:
 TV announcers:

Scoring Drives:

 Pittsburgh – O'Brien 4 pass from Finks (Michalik kick)
 Chicago Cardinals – Sanford 92 interception (Summerall kick)
 Pittsburgh – Mathews 27 pass from Finks (Michalik kick)

Week 2 (Sunday October 2, 1955): Los Angeles Rams 

at Los Angeles Coliseum, Los Angeles, California

 Game time:
 Game weather:
 Game attendance: 46,185
 Referee:
 TV announcers:

Scoring Drives:

 Los Angeles – Towler 1 run (Richter kick)
 Los Angeles – FG Richter 12
 Los Angeles – Boyd 74 pass from Van Brocklin (Richter kick)
 Pittsburgh – Chandnois 8 run (Michalik kick)
 Pittsburgh – Finks 1 run (kick failed)
 Pittsburgh – Chandnois 2 run (kick failed)
 Los Angeles – Fears 17 pass from Van Brocklin (Richter kick)
 Pittsburgh – McCabe 50 fumble run (Michalik kick)
 Los Angeles – FG Richter 32

Week 3 (Sunday October 9, 1955): New York Giants 

at Forbes Field, Pittsburgh, Pennsylvania

 Game time:
 Game weather:
 Game attendance: 29,422
 Referee:
 TV announcers:

Scoring Drives:

 New York Giants – Rote 25 pass from Gifford (Agajanian kick)
 Pittsburgh – Bernet 13 pass from Finks (kick blocked)
 New York Giants – FG Agajanian 27
 Pittsburgh – FG Michalik 36
 Pittsburgh – Finks 1 run (Michalik kick)
 New York Giants – Long 34 pass from Conerly (Agajanian kick)
 Pittsburgh – Rogel 1 run (Michalik kick)
 New York Giants – Rote 71 pass from Conerly (kick blocked)
 Pittsburgh – Mathews 23 pass from Finks (Michalik kick)

Week 4 (Saturday November 15, 1955): Philadelphia Eagles 

at Forbes Field, Pittsburgh, Pennsylvania

 Game time:
 Game weather:
 Game attendance: 33,413
 Referee:
 TV announcers:

Scoring Drives:

 Pittsburgh – Finks 1 run (Michalik kick)
 Philadelphia – Bawel 42 interception (Bielski kick)
 Pittsburgh – Chandnois 2 run (kick failed)

Week 5 (Sunday October 23, 1955): New York Giants 

at Polo Grounds, New York, New York

 Game time:
 Game weather:
 Game attendance: 27,365
 Referee:
 TV announcers:

Scoring Drives:

 Pittsburgh – Mathews 21 run (kick failed)
 New York Giants – Rote 5 pass from Heinrich (Agajanian kick)
 Pittsburgh – Finks 2 run (Michalik kick)
 New York Giants – Schnelker 16 pass from Conerly (Agajanian kick)
 New York Giants – FG Agajanian 45
 Pittsburgh – Chandnois 4 run (kick failed)

Week 6 (Sunday October 30, 1955): Philadelphia Eagles 

at Connie Mack Stadium, Philadelphia, Pennsylvania

 Game time:
 Game weather:
 Game attendance: 31,164
 Referee:
 TV announcers:

Scoring Drives:

 Philadelphia – Wegert 29 run (Bielski kick)
 Philadelphia – Pihos 1- pass from Burk (Bielski kick)
 Philadelphia – Wegert 2 run (Bielski kick)
 Philadelphia – FG Bielski 50

Week 7 (Saturday November 5, 1955): Chicago Cardinals 

at Comiskey Park, Chicago, Illinois

 Game time:
 Game weather:
 Game attendance: 23,310
 Referee:
 TV announcers:

Scoring Drives:

 Pittsburgh – FG Weed 30
 Chicago Cardinals – FG Summerall 21
 Chicago Cardinals – Summerall 26 interception (Summerall kick)
 Pittsburgh – FG Weed 23
 Pittsburgh – Mathews 21 pass from Finks
 Chicago Cardinals – Nagler 34 pass from McHan (Summerall kick)
 Chicago Cardinals – Mann 18 pass from McHan (Summerall kick)
 Chicago Cardinals – FG Summerall 34

Week 8 (Sunday November 13, 1955): Detroit Lions 

at Forbes Field, Pittsburgh, Pennsylvania

 Game time:
 Game weather:
 Game attendance: 34,441
 Referee:
 TV announcers:

Scoring Drives:

 Detroit – Middleton 30 pass from Layne (Walker kick)
 Detroit – Carpenter 34 pass from Gilmer (Walker kick)
 Pittsburgh – O'Brien 6 pass from Finks (Weed kick)
 Detroit – FG Walker 23
 Detroit – Walker 21 pass from Stits (Walker kick)
 Pittsburgh – Chandnois 1 run (Weed kick)
 Detroit – Stits 7 interception
 Pittsburgh – Mathews 47 pass from Marchibroda (Weed kick)
 Pittsburgh – Marchibroda 8 run (Weed kick)

Week 9 (Sunday November 20, 1955): Cleveland Browns 

at Cleveland Municipal Stadium, Cleveland, Ohio

 Game time:
 Game weather:
 Game attendance: 53,509
 Referee:
 TV announcers:

Scoring Drives:

 Pittsburgh – Nickel 16 pass from Finks (Weed kick)
 Cleveland – Konz 15 interception (Groza kick)
 Cleveland – Lavelli 6 pass from Graham (Groza kick)
 Pittsburgh – Nickel 30 pass from Marchibroda (Weed kick)
 Cleveland – Lavelli 42 pass from Graham (Groza kick)
 Cleveland – Modzelewshi 3 run (kick blocked)
 Cleveland – Graham 4 run (Groza kick)
 Cleveland – Bassett 5 run (Groza kick)

Week 10 (Sunday November 27, 1955): Washington Redskins 

at Forbes Field, Pittsburgh, Pennsylvania

 Game time:
 Game weather:
 Game attendance: 21,760
 Referee:
 TV announcers:

Scoring Drives:

 Washington – Elter 20 run (Hecker kick)
 Pittsburgh – Mathews 61 pass from Finks (Weed kick)
 Washington – Elter 33 run (Janowicz kick)
 Washington – FG Janowicz 13
 Washington – Scudero 49 punt return (kick failed)
 Pittsburgh – Watson 62 pass from Finks (Weed kick)

Week 11 (Sunday December 4, 1955): Cleveland Browns 

at Forbes Field, Pittsburgh, Pennsylvania

 Game time:
 Game weather:
 Game attendance: 31,101
 Referee:
 TV announcers:

Scoring Drives:

 Cleveland – Graham 4 run (Groza kick)
 Cleveland – FG Groza 16
 Cleveland – Renfro 46 pass from Graham (Groza kick)
 Cleveland – FG Groza 22
 Cleveland – Brewster 17 pass from Graham (Groza kick)
 Cleveland – FG Groza 46
 Pittsburgh – O'Malley recovered blocked kick in end zone (Weed kick)

Week 12 (Sunday December 11, 1955): Washington Redskins 

at Griffith Stadium, Washington, DC

 Game time:
 Game weather:
 Game attendance: 20,547
 Referee:
 TV announcers:

Scoring Drives:

 Washington – Elter 22 run (Janowicz kick)
 Pittsburgh – Rogel 1 run (Weed kick)
 Pittsburgh – Mathews 29 pass from Finks (Weed kick)
 Pittsburgh – FG Weed 9
 Washington – Thomas 11 pass from LeBaron
 Washington – Atkeson 5 pass from LeBaron (Janowicz kick)
 Washington – Janowicz 3 run (Janowicz kick)

Standings

References 

Pittsburgh Steelers seasons
Pittsburgh Steelers
Pitts